Lover is an unincorporated community in Washington County, Pennsylvania, United States.

Lover is located along Pennsylvania Route 481.

The Lover Church is located north of the settlement.

References

Unincorporated communities in Washington County, Pennsylvania
Unincorporated communities in Pennsylvania